Mount Hook is a mountainous snow-covered projection from the east side of Saratoga Table,  southeast of Sorna Bluff, in the Forrestal Range of the Pensacola Mountains, Antarctica. It was named by the Advisory Committee on Antarctic Names in 1979 after Lieutenant Commander Richard M. Hook of the U.S. Navy, who was a Medical Officer at South Pole Station in the winter of 1968.

References

Mountains of Queen Elizabeth Land
Pensacola Mountains